TV UNAM (stylized as tvunam and tv•unam, formerly written teveunam) is an educational television network owned and operated by the National Autonomous University of Mexico (UNAM) in Mexico City.

Programming on TV UNAM generally consists of educational telecourse programs for UNAM students, plus public affairs, documentary and cultural programming. Some TV UNAM programming can also be seen on the nationwide Edusat service.

History
The UNAM began broadcasts on XHUNAM-TV analog channel 60 on December 5, 2000, in Mexico City in order to pave the way for their own television network. It broadcast for five years before being renewed in 2005 as a digital-only station, the first in Mexico.

As part of the project, UNAM's DGTU (Dirección General de Televisión Universitaria or TV UNAM) began the broadcast of TV UNAM on October 24, 2005, on cable and satellite TV systems, including Cablevisión in the Valley of México and satellite TV provider SKY, and later Dish México. (As of 2014, TV UNAM is now required carriage for all cable systems in Mexico alongside several other public and cultural stations.) With the help of the government-owned OPMA public television network (now Sistema Público de Radiodifusión del Estado Mexicano (SPR)), it expanded its coverage as an over-the-air digital subchannel. TV UNAM is generally on the air daily from 8am to as early as midnight (longer on some nights, especially if there is a movie or concert scheduled).

Although XHUNAM-TDT continues to operate on digital channel 20 in Mexico City, it has largely been used for experimental transmissions and does not broadcast the programming of TV UNAM. SPR's Mexico City station XHSPR-TDT carries it on channel 20.1.

References

National Autonomous University of Mexico
Public television in Mexico
Spanish-language television stations in Mexico
Television channels and stations established in 2005